The Baker Wildcats football program is a college football team that represents Baker University in the Heart of America Athletic Conference, a part of the NAIA.  The team has had 21 head coaches since its first recorded football game in 1890. The current coach is Mike Grossner who first took the position for the 2004 season.

Key

Coaches
Statistics correct as of the end of the 2021 college football season.

See also

 List of lists of people from Kansas

Notes

References

Baker

Kansas sports-related lists